The Sahar, Sehariya, or Sahariya are an ethnic group in the state of Madhya Pradesh, India. The Saharias are mainly found in the districts of Morena, Sheopur, Bhind, Gwalior, Datia, Shivpuri, Vidisha and Guna districts of Madhya Pradesh and Baran district of Rajasthan.They are classified as Particularly vulnerable tribal group.

History

The history of the Saharia tribe is spotty and in many places completely lost. The older generations of the Saharia tribespeople fail to give any account of their history, and written records of ancestry are virtually nonexistent. 
Traditionally, they trace their beginnings to the days of the Ramayana and beyond. They trace their origin from Bhil Shabari of the Ramayan. Another theory suggests that Brahma, the creator was busy casting the Universe. He made out a place to seat all persons. In the centre of that place he put a Sahariya who was a simpleton. Others came to join him sitting but they pushed him further from the square centre to an extreme corner or khoont. The story goes that an annoyed Brahma chided the Sahariya for his inability to cope with the pressure and decreed that he would henceforth live in forests and such other out of the way places. Some Sahariya's claim descent from Baiju Bhil, a worshiper of the Hindu god Shiva.

Dwelling
They inhabit clusters of houses in areas called saharana outside the main villages. The housing is generally characterized by prehistoric standards made of stone boulders and roofing of stone slabs that locally are called patore. In some villages mud structures are also constructed. Brick and concrete are very rare. They live in small joint families. The elder sons live separately after marriage and younger son bear the responsibilities of the parents and unmarried brothers-sisters.

Religion
The tribe members believe in Animism Folk Hinduism's gods and goddess that they worship and celebrate in major festivals: Veer Teja, thakar Baba, Durga, Hanuman, Lalbai, Bejasan, Savni Amavasya, Janmashtami, Raksha Bandhan, Deepavali, Holi and Teja Dashmi.

Marriage
They consider everyone in an endogamous group to be brother and sister; marriages have to be arranged from other clans. During the marriage ceremony, totems are drawn on paper and the floor that they hold in reverence. Child marriage is not favored, although there are some arranged marriages, and any marriage is performed after attaining the age of 15 years. Widow marriage called not is permitted but only to a fellow widower or a divorcee. Polygamy is reserved only for males.

Social life
The Sahariya community considers every adult member part of a governing council which is headed by a patel. A patel's appointment is based on heredity criteria but found to be unfit or unsuitable is basis for removal. The council decides disputes by a consensus. It imposes fines and ostracism on guilty offenders committing rape, elopement or adultery. An inter-village dispute is referred to as a Chokla Panchayat. Since they may be surrounded by speakers of other languages and dialects they may speak various Hindi dialects.

Economy
The Sahariyas are expert woodsmen and forest product gatherers. They are particularly skilled in making catechu from Khair trees. The main business is gathering & selling of forest wood, gum, tendu leaf, honey, mahua and medicinal herbs. Their traditional occupations also include making baskets, mining and quarrying, and breaking stones. They also hunt and fish.
 
Some Sahariyas are settled cultivators. Wheat, pearl millet and maize are the main cereal crops. Gram and arhar are the main pulses. Agriculture is largely rain-dependent with merely 2% of the total land area being irrigated. The main sources of irrigation are wells and rivulets, which are seasonal. Others are landless labourers who were earlier bonded labourers.

Health 
 
The general health conditions of the tribe are very poor. There is prevalence of malnutrition and pulmonary tuberculosis. RNTCP-DOTS programme is working effectively to change this condition. The Centre for Genomics at Jiwaji University, Gwalior is carrying out active clinical and genetic research in order to identify the genetic and non-genetic underlying causes for their ailments.

Notable People
 Gyarsi Bai Sahariya a tribal leader from Baran district.
  Sarbeswar Sahariah (Assamese) An award winning Indian nephrologist and organ transplant specialist

See also
 Kuno Wildlife Sanctuary

References
 
 Ethnological study of the Saharia tribe of Morena District, Madhya Pradesh

Joshi, Vibha 1987 'A Primitive Tribe of Madhya Pradesh: Social Organization and Religion of the Sahariya'. M.Phil Dissertation. Department of Anthropology, Delhi University. 

V.J.Patel(Vibha Joshi) 1993. 35 minute ethnographic film 'The Sahariya of Madhya Pradesh' filmed in 1992-3 in Sheopur kala division (now a district), in Palpur village in Palpur-Kuno forest, and in Agra, Ameth Parond and other villages of Morena, M.P. (includes an interview of surrendered dacoit, Ramesh Singh Sikarwar) . Anthropological Survey of India.Kolkatta Also see: 

Srivastava, Vinay Kumar 2016 'Speaking of Caste: Merit of the Principle of Segmentation', Sociological Bulletin.

Further reading

Social groups of Rajasthan
Social groups of Madhya Pradesh
Joshi, Vibha 1987 'A Primitive Tribe of Madhya Pradesh: Social Organization and Religion of the Sahariya'. M.Phil Thesis. Department of Anthropology, Delhi University.supervision by Vinay Kumar Srivastava.

V.J.Patel (name used then by Vibha Joshi) 1993. 35 minute ethnographic film 'The Sahariya of Madhya Pradesh' filmed in 1992-3 in Sheopur kala division (now a district), in Palpur village in Palpur-Kuno forest, and in Agra, Ameth and other villages  of Morena, M.P.  (includes an interview of surrendered dacoit, Ramesh Singh Sikarwar) . Anthropological Survey of India.Kolkatta

Also see: Srivastava, Vinay Kumar 2016 'Speaking of Caste: Merit of the Principle of Segmentation', Sociological Bulletin.